Baughan is a surname. Notable people with the surname include:

Blanche Baughan (1870–1958), English-born New Zealand poet, writer, and penal reformer
John Baughan (1754–1797), English criminal
Maxie Baughan (born 1938), American football player